Fimbristylis littoralis, commonly known as lesser fimbry or lesser fimbristylis, is a sedge of the family Cyperaceae that is native to many countries in Africa, Asia and Oceania including across much of northern Australia.

Description
In Australia it blooms between February and August and produces green-brown flowers. It has slender culms slender with a length of  that are four or five-angled and quite flattened.

Taxonomy
The species was first formally described by the botanist Charles Gaudichaud-Beaupré in 1829 as part of the work Voyage Autour du Monde ... sur les Corvettes de S.M. l'Uranie et la Physicienne as published in Botanique.

Distribution
In Australia it is found in Western Australia it is found in swamps, along creeks and rivers and other damp areas in the Kimberley region where it grows in sandy-clay alluvium often around basalt. It is also found across the top end of the Northern Territory and tropical parts of Queensland.

The species has been introduced and is regarded as a weed throughout North and South America. It is thought to have been introduced into the West Indies as a contaminant late in the nineteenth century and was collected in 1886 in Puerto Rico.

It is known to be problematic in rice plantations throughout tropical and subtropical regions of the world. It is also found in bananas and maize plantations in Taiwan, abaca plantations in the Philippines, taro plantations in Hawaii and sugarcane and maize crops in Indonesia.

References

External links

Plants described in 1829
Flora of Western Australia
littoralis
Flora of the Northern Territory
Flora of Queensland
Taxa named by Charles Gaudichaud-Beaupré